Governor Lawrence may refer to:

Charles Lawrence (British Army officer) (1709–1760), Governor of Nova Scotia from 1753 to 1760
David L. Lawrence (1889–1966), Governor of Pennsylvania
Edmund Wickham Lawrence (born 1932), Governor-General of St. Kitts and Nevis
Elisha Lawrence (1746–1799), Acting Governor of New Jersey
Henry Staveley Lawrence (1870–1949), Acting Governor of Bombay from 1926 to 1928
John Lawrence, 1st Baron Lawrence (1811–1879), Governor-General of India from 1864 to 1869
Thomas Lawrence (Governor of Maryland) (1645–1714), Royal Governor of Maryland